Juan Manuel Dávalos Padilla (born 30 April 1953) is a Mexican politician affiliated with the Institutional Revolutionary Party. As of 2014 he served as Deputy of the LIX Legislature of the Mexican Congress representing Guanajuato.

References

1953 births
Living people
Politicians from Jalisco
Institutional Revolutionary Party politicians
Deputies of the LIX Legislature of Mexico
Members of the Chamber of Deputies (Mexico) for Guanajuato